Naked Harbour is a 2012 Finnish drama film directed by Aku Louhimies.

Synopsis
The film takes place in Vuosaari, the easternmost suburb of Helsinki, Finland. The plot revolves around several families, around which love plays a theme in the midst of very adverse interpersonal relationships.

Cast
 Sean Pertwee as Robert
 Amanda Pilke as Milla
 Jasper Pääkkönen as Anders
 Laura Birn as Iiris
 Mikko Kouki as Pertti
 Lenna Kuurmaa as Viivi
 Taneli Mäkelä as Milla's father
 Matleena Kuusniemi as Sara
 Deogracias Masomi as Make

References

External links
 

2012 drama films
2012 films
Finnish drama films
2010s Finnish-language films